The British Diving Championships are an annual event organised by British Swimming (the governing body of swimming in the United Kingdom).

History
Historically the Championships was held as part of the British Swimming Championships but they became a stand-alone Championships in 1963.

Previously the Championships were known as the Amateur Swimming Association (ASA) National Championships.

Disciplines
 1 metre springboard - British Diving Championships - 1 metre springboard diving winners
 3 metre springboard - British Diving Championships - 3 metre springboard diving winners
 10 metre platform - British Diving Championships - 10 metre platform diving winners
 synchronised 3 metre springboard - British Diving Championships - synchronised 3 metre springboard diving winners
 synchronised 10 metre platform - British Diving Championships - synchronised 10 metre platform diving winners
 plain (discontinued) - British Diving Championships - plain diving winners

Venues and dates (since 2004)

See also
British Swimming
List of British Swimming Championships champions

References

Diving in the United Kingdom